"Muza" (Eng.: Muse) is a song by the Slovene duo BQL. It was written by Raay and Tina Piš. It was their first single released in Slovenia, on 30 June 2016. The song reached number 1 on the Slovenian Singles Chart.

Formats and track listings 
Digital download
"Muza" – 3:49

Credits and personnel 
 Raay – music, producer
 Anej Piletič – vocals, guitar 
 Rok Piletič – vocals 
 Tina Piš – lyrics

Charts

Weekly charts

Year-end charts

Release history

References 

2016 songs
2016 singles
Slovene-language songs